Mount Huntington is a striking rock and ice pyramid in the central Alaska Range, about 8 miles (13 km) south-southeast of Denali. It is also about 6 miles (10 km) east of Mount Hunter, and two miles west of The Rooster Comb. Even its easiest route presents significantly more technical challenge than the standard route on Denali, and it is a favorite peak for high-standard technical climbers.

Mount Huntington was first climbed in 1964 by a French expedition led by famed alpinist Lionel Terray, via the Northwest Ridge, from then on also called the French Ridge. The second ascent the following year, via the West Face/West Rib, is reported by David Roberts in The Mountain of My Fear. The mountain can be accessed either from the West Fork of the Ruth Glacier, on the north side of the mountain, or the Tokositna Glacier, on the south side.

Notable ascents
 1964 French Ridge Lionel Terray et al.
 1965 Harvard Route (VI 5.9 A2 70-degree ice) by David Roberts, Ed Bernd, Don Jensen, Matt Hale.
 1978 North Face Jack Roberts and Simon McCartney, summit reached on July 6, 1978.
 1978 Southeast Spur Joseph Kaelin, Kent Meneghin, Glenn Randall and Angus M. Thuermer Jr., summit reached on July 9, 1978.
 1980 The British Route, East Face Roger Mear and Steve Bell, summit reached on May 16, 1980.
 1981 Colton-Leach Route, West Face Nick Colton, Tim Leach.
 1989 Nettle-Quirk Route disputed FA by Dave Nettle and James Quirk, summit reached May 24, 1989.
 2017 Gauntlet Ridge , Clint Helander and Jess Roskelley, five days on route, two nights spent sleeping on summit.

Popular Culture
Characteristics of the mountain was the inspiration of the Paramount Pictures logo.

References

Further reading

External links
 American Alpine Journal "The Timeless Face: The North Face of Mount Huntington" by JACK ROBERTS, Bufl Alpine Club
 Mount Huntington on Summitpost.org

Mountains of Matanuska-Susitna Borough, Alaska
Mountains of Alaska
Denali National Park and Preserve
Alaska Range
Mountains of Denali National Park and Preserve